HMNZS Kahu (A04) was a  inshore patrol vessel of the Royal New Zealand Navy. She was launched in 1979 as the lead boat of her class, modified to function as a diving tender. She was initially named HMNZS Manawanui (A09), the second of soon to be four diving tenders with this name to serve in the New Zealand Navy. As a diving tender she participated in the exploration and salvage work of the wreck  in March 1986.

On 17 May 1988, she was renamed Kahu (A04) and recommissioned as the basic seamanship and navigation training vessel attached to the Royal New Zealand Naval College. Kahu is the second boat with this name to serve in the New Zealand Navy. (The name comes from the Māori-language  - the name for the native swamp harrier hawk.)

She remained in service for seamanship, Officer of the Watch training and as a backup diving tender until her decommissioning on 30 October 2009. The ship was sold for use as a pleasure craft on 18 February 2010.

Kahu was distinguished from other boats of the Moa class by the gantry on her quarterdeck and lack of funnels.

Post RNZN Career 
After leaving the Royal New Zealand Navy she was sold to Peter White-Robinson and renamed Kahu. In 2011 she underwent a year long refit at Fitzroy Yachts in New Plymouth, converting her to a 'family ship'. In 2013 she was sold.

In 2021 the vessel was involved in a £160,000,000 drugs bust when she was intercepted by HMC Searcher 130 km off the coast of Plymouth. 1 British Citizen and 5 Nicaraguan citizens were arrested. 2000kgs of Cocaine was reported to be onboard.

See also 
 Patrol boats of the Royal New Zealand Navy
 Diving tenders of the Royal New Zealand Navy

Notes

References 
 McDougall, R J  (1989) New Zealand Naval Vessels. Page 136–137. Government Printing Office.

External links 
 Official RNZN Website

1978 ships
Moa-class patrol boats
Training ships of the Royal New Zealand Navy